Weightlifting was part of the 1979 National Games of China held in Beijing. Only men competed in ten bodyweight categories and for the first time in National Games history the classification matched the international standard at the time.

The competition program at the National Games mirrors that of the Olympic Games as only medals for the total achieved are awarded, but not for individual lifts in either the snatch or clean and jerk. Likewise an athlete failing to register a snatch result cannot advance to the clean and jerk.

Medal summary

Men

Medal table

References
Archived results of the 1979 Games 

1979 in weightlifting
1979
Weight